Isaac Toast, is a toast (toasted sandwich) chain based in South Korea. As of 2016, the chain has over 700 retail stores in South Korea. It has further expanded internationally and established branches including Macau, Taiwan, Malaysia, and Singapore. It is named after Isaac, the Hebrew patriarch of Genesis.

References

External links
  

South Korean brands
Fast-food chains of South Korea